Diego Negri (born 16 April 1971) is an Italian former yacht racer who competed in the 2000 Summer Olympics, in the 2004 Summer Olympics, and in the 2008 Summer Olympics.

References

External links
 
 
 

1971 births
Living people
Italian male sailors (sport)
Olympic sailors of Italy
Sailors at the 2000 Summer Olympics – Laser
Sailors at the 2004 Summer Olympics – Laser
Sailors at the 2008 Summer Olympics – Star
Mediterranean Games silver medalists for Italy
Competitors at the 2005 Mediterranean Games
Mediterranean Games medalists in sailing